There is a small community of ethnic Macedonians in the Czech Republic. Among the refugees of the Greek Civil War who were admitted to Czechoslovakia in the late 1940s, roughly 4,000 were of Macedonian ethnicity; they resettled primarily in the Czech portion of the country.

Notable people

Petra Cetkovská (b. 1985), a tennis player
Marek Jankulovski (b. 1977), a football player

See also 
Czech Republic–North Macedonia relations

Notes

Sources

Ethnic groups in the Czech Republic

Macedonian diaspora